Greete is a civil parish in Shropshire, England.  It contains 15 listed buildings that are recorded in the National Heritage List for England.  Of these, three are at Grade II*, the middle of the three grades, and the others are at Grade II, the lowest grade.  The parish contains the hamlet of Greete and the surrounding countryside, and the listed buildings consist of a church, memorials in the churchyard, houses, farmhouses, farm buildings, and a telephone kiosk.


Key

Buildings

References

Citations

Sources

Lists of buildings and structures in Shropshire